Elections to Ards Borough Council were held on 21 May 1997 on the same day as the other Northern Irish local government elections. The election used four district electoral areas to elect a total of 23 councillors.

Election results

Note: "Votes" are the first preference votes.

Districts summary

|- class="unsortable" align="centre"
!rowspan=2 align="left"|Ward
! % 
!Cllrs
! % 
!Cllrs
! %
!Cllrs
! %
!Cllrs
! %
!Cllrs
!rowspan=2|TotalCllrs
|- class="unsortable" align="center"
!colspan=2 bgcolor="" | UUP
!colspan=2 bgcolor="" | DUP
!colspan=2 bgcolor="" | Alliance
!colspan=2 bgcolor="" | SDLP
!colspan=2 bgcolor="white"| Others
|-
|align="left"|Ards East
|bgcolor="40BFF5"|52.1
|bgcolor="40BFF5"|4
|23.0
|1
|15.3
|1
|0.0
|0
|9.6
|0
|6
|-
|align="left"|Ards West
|bgcolor="40BFF5"|56.1
|bgcolor="40BFF5"|3
|18.8
|1
|25.1
|2
|0.0
|0
|0.0
|0
|6
|-
|align="left"|Newtownards
|26.6
|2
|18.6
|1
|15.4
|1
|0.0
|0
|bgcolor="#0077FF"|39.4
|bgcolor="#0077FF"|2
|6
|-
|align="left"|Peninsula
|22.6
|1
|bgcolor="#D46A4C"|29.7
|bgcolor="#D46A4C"|2
|28.8
|1
|18.2
|1
|0.7
|0
|5
|- class="unsortable" class="sortbottom" style="background:#C9C9C9"
|align="left"| Total
|39.6
|10
|22.6
|5
|21.1
|5
|4.6
|1
|12.1
|0
|23
|-
|}

Districts results

Ards East

1993: 3 x UUP, 2 x DUP, 1 x Alliance
1997: 4 x UUP, 1 x DUP, 1 x Alliance
1993-1997 Change: UUP gain from DUP

Ards West

1993: 3 x UUP, 2 x Alliance, 1 x DUP
1997: 3 x UUP, 2 x Alliance, 1 x DUP
1993-1997 Change: No change

Newtownards

1993: 2 x UUP, 2 x DUP, 1 x Alliance, 1 x Independent Unionist
1997: 2 x DUP, 2 x Independent Unionist, 1 x DUP, 1 x Alliance
1993-1997 Change: Independent Unionist gain from DUP

Peninsula

1993: 2 x Alliance, 1 x DUP, 1 x UUP, 1 x Independent
1997: 2 x DUP, 1 x UUP, 1 x Alliance, 1 x SDLP
1997-2001 Change: DUP and SDLP gain from Alliance and Independent

References

Ards Borough Council elections
Ards